Code page 853 (CCSID 853) (also known as CP 853 or IBM 00853) is a code page used under DOS to write Turkish, Maltese, and Esperanto. It includes all characters from ISO 8859-3.

Character set
Only the second half is shown, codes 0-127 are the same as code page 437.

References

853